The Agua Caliente Solar Project is a 290 megawatt (MWAC)  photovoltaic power station, built in Yuma County, Arizona using 5.2 million cadmium telluride modules made by the U.S. thin-film manufacturer First Solar. It was the largest solar facility in the world when the project was commissioned in April 2014.

History 

39 MW was online as of December 2011 and 100 MW was completed as of April 2012. 200 MW was completed as of July 2012, and 247 MW in August 2012, when the 10th section was completed. The addition of more panels has halted until 2013, with crates of panels covered to protect them.  Full power was achieved ahead of schedule in September 2013.

Project overview 

In August 2011, the Department of Energy finalized a $967 million loan guarantee for the project. The project sponsor, NRG Solar, estimated the photovoltaic generation facility would fund approximately 400 construction jobs and 16 full-time operating jobs, and would become one of the largest plants of its kind in the world when completed. The power produced is being sold to PG&E (Pacific Gas & Electric) in California in a 25-year Power Purchase Agreement.

The Series 3 thin film panels use CdS/CdTe, and are rated from 77 watts to 82.5 watts each, and are mounted at a fixed tilt angle. 20,940 are connected in each array, rated at 1.26 MWAC. 400 SMA 720CP inverters were initially foreseen, but in the end 500 SMA 630CP are used. Installed modules total power is 410 megawatt-peak (MWDC).

Award 

In February 2012, Agua Caliente competed in the Excellence in Renewable Energy Awards and won Project of the Year Award.

Electricity production 
Agua Caliente Solar Project's production is as follows, averaging 727 GW·h annual, yielding about 300 MW·h/acre.

The Loan Programs Office projected annual generation, calculated using the project's and NREL Technology specific capacity factors, was of 559 GW·h. Sector estimates predicted an average production of about 626 GW·h each year.

See also

 Arizona Solar Center
 Solar power in Arizona

References

External links
 Project Datasheet

Energy infrastructure completed in 2014
Solar power stations in Arizona
2014 establishments in Arizona
Photovoltaic power stations in the United States
NRG Energy